The rivière à la Carpe is a tributary of the eastern shore of the Métabetchouane River, in the administrative region of Saguenay–Lac-Saint-Jean, in the province of Quebec, in Canada. Entirely in a forest zone, the course of this river crosses the unorganized territory of Belle-Rivière, in the Lac-Saint-Jean-Est Regional County Municipality and the municipality of Saint-André-du-Lac-Saint-Jean, in the Le Domaine-du-Roy Regional County Municipality.

Forestry is the main economic activity in this area; recreational tourism, second.

The surface of the "rivière à la Carpe" (except the rapids zones) is usually frozen from the end of November to the beginning of April, however the safe circulation on the ice is generally done from mid-December to the end of March.

Geography 
The main watersheds neighboring the "rivière à la Carpe" are:
north side: Métabetchouane River, l'Abbé River, MacDonald River, Lac Saint-Jean;
east side: La Belle Rivière, Barnabé stream, Lac de la Belle Rivière, and rivière du Milieu;
south side: Métabetchouane River and lac à la Carpe;
west side: Métabetchouane River, Bruyante River and Prudent River.

The Carp River takes its source at the mouth of Lac Neuf. This lake receives two streams which are surrounded by marshes.

 towards the northwest by collecting two discharges from small unidentified lakes, up to a bend of a river where a stream pours into it;
 toward the west it forms very small coils and by collecting the outlet of "Lac à la Vache", until the discharge of Lac à la Carpe
 toward the west, it forms small streamers and by collecting two discharges from small unidentified lakes, as well as by crossing three series of rapids, up to a bend in the river;
 toward northwest, bending west at the end of the segment and collecting a stream, to its mouth, located on the east bank of the Métabetchouane River.

Toponymy 
The toponym "rivière à la Carpe" was formalized on December 5, 1968, at the Place Names Bank of the Commission de toponymie du Québec.

Notes and references

See also 

 Belle-Rivière, an unorganized territory
 Saint-André-du-Lac-Saint-Jean, a municipality
 Lac à la Carpe (rivière à la Carpe), a body of water
 Laurentides Wildlife Reserve
 Métabetchouane River
 Lac Saint-Jean, a body of water
 Saguenay River
 St. Lawrence River
 List of rivers of Quebec

Rivers of Saguenay–Lac-Saint-Jean
Lac-Saint-Jean-Est Regional County Municipality
Le Domaine-du-Roy Regional County Municipality